The 2019 Super Rugby Final was played between the Crusaders of New Zealand and the Jaguares of Argentina. It was the 24th final in the Super Rugby competition's history. The Crusaders had qualified in first place on the regular season standings, while the Jaguares had qualified in second place. Both teams hosted quarter-final and semi-final matches.

The final was won by the Crusaders who beat the Jaguares by sixteen points. The Crusaders stretched their record number of Super Rugby wins to ten and completed what is called a three-peat by winning the tournament three times consecutively in what was the competition's lowest scoring final.

Road to the final 

The 2019 season was a 15-team competition, consisting of three geographical conferences. Their four wildcard opponents in the quarterfinals were the next best teams as ranked at the end of the regular season.

In the quarter-finals the Crusaders beat fellow New Zealand team the Highlanders while the Jaguares beat the Chiefs. For the semi-finals it was the Crusaders defeating the Hurricanes in Christchurch and the Jaguares defeating the Brumbies in Buenos Aires. Because of being the higher placed team in the regular season log standings, the final was held in Christchurch.

Quarterfinals

Semifinals

Final

Details

References 

2019 Super Rugby season
Super Rugby finals
2019 in New Zealand rugby union
2019 in Argentine rugby union
Crusaders (rugby union) matches
Sports competitions in Christchurch